The Academy Achievement Award is an award presented by the Canadian Gemini Awards to an individual for their "exceptional, outstanding or ongoing contribution or service to the Canadian television industry."  It is presented at the discretion of the Academy of Canadian Cinema & Television (not necessarily every year).

List of past recipients
1996: W.K. Donovan
1997: Arthur Weinthal
1998: Jim Burt
1999: A. Gordon Craig
2000: W. Paterson Ferns
2001: Dorothy Gardner
2002: Trina McQueen
2003: Michael Maclear

2007: John Kastner
2010: Linda Schuyler
2011: Christina Jennings

See also

 Canadian television awards

References

External links
Gemini Awards: Special Awards

Gemini Awards
Lifetime achievement awards